"What Kind of Man Would I Be?" is a song written by Jason Scheff, Chas Sandford and Bobby Caldwell and recorded by the band Chicago for their 1988 album Chicago 19 and 1989 album Greatest Hits 1982–1989. Scheff sang the lead vocals.

A slightly remixed version of the song by Humberto Gatica was included on the 1989 compilation album Greatest Hits 1982–1989, and a single release of that remix peaked at number 5 on the US Billboard Hot 100 on February 24, 1990; as of 2022, it is Chicago's final top ten hit. This song features horns more prominently than other Chicago singles from the era, which had tended to de-emphasize or omit them altogether.

Charts

Weekly charts

Year-end charts

References

1988 songs
1989 singles
1990 singles
Chicago (band) songs
Rock ballads
Songs written by Bobby Caldwell
Full Moon Records singles
Reprise Records singles
Songs written by Jason Scheff
Songs written by Chas Sandford
1980s ballads